The Carlisle Turkish baths were an Edwardian public baths in Carlisle, Cumbria, England.  They adjoined the city's 1884 swimming pool and were constructed in 1908-1909.  The baths offered saunas, plunge pools and shower and were advertised as providing health benefits to patrons.  The baths remained in use until November 2022 and retain their original tiling and faience work, which is of unusually good quality.  A local campaign is seeking to reopen the baths.

Description 
The building's red-brick western façade faces onto James Street; it was the only external wall visible from outside until the demolition of adjacent buildings on the southern side.  The western portion of the building includes the main entrance leading to an attendant's room and waiting rooms.  This single-storey structure was enclosed by a 2-storey structure at a later date, leaving a relatively plain façade and entrance. The entrance block retains the original glazed doors and the attendant's room features a corner fireplace. 

A corridor from the entrance block leads into a double height structure housing a cooling room and a single-storey structure containing a plunge bath, shower room and Russian vapour bath.  The cooling room is the centrepiece of the complex and retains the original concrete plunge bath and steps, lined in white-glazed bricks.  Five changing rooms along the walls have green and yellow tiled surrounds.   A stained glass ceiling is lit from above by a lantern atop a pyramidal roof. 

A single-storey structure adjacent to the cooling room houses a further plunge bath, shower room and Russian vapour bath.  A two-storey block beyond the cooling room houses a shampooing room and beyond that are three warm rooms (saunas). 

The roofs are in slate.   The interior is oriental themed, with Moorish-style arches, and includes art nouveau motifs such as paired tiles.   The interior has a terrazzo floor and marble benches.   The faience and tiling throughout makes use of pale green, pale blue and buff glazes and has been described as being of "good quality and complete".

History 
Planning for a Turkish baths in Carlisle began in 1884 when the swimming pool was opened at James Street by the County Borough of Carlisle.  The borough revived the plans in 1901 and agreed to proceed with construction of the baths, adjacent to the swimming pool, in 1902.  Designs, by the county surveyor W. C. Marks, were not approved until 1908.  Construction was carried out by William Johnstone of Carlisle at a total cost of £2,500; the tiling and faience work was by Minton and Hollins of Stoke-on-Trent.

The baths opened to the public on 20 September 1909. They were advertised for the "alleviation of rheumatism and kindred ailments, general tonic effect, obesity and alleviation of stress". Bathers initially paid between 1 and 2 shillings for a session of around 1.5 hours.  In 1957 more than 100,000 people used the baths and adjacent swimming pool. In the 1960s the baths also  offered massages and tea and toast was served to the changing rooms.

The baths were granted statutory protection by Historic England on 19 February 2010 as a grade II listed building.  The organisation described them as "an increasingly rare example of a once common building form, of which only around 20 remain in England; it compares very favourably with the eight existing listed Turkish Baths".  An October 2022 report in The Guardian describes them as "one of the most affordable Turkish baths in the UK, with entry costing £7.10".  In late 2022 the baths won the "best small tourist attraction" prize at the Cumbria Life Awards.  By this time the running of the baths had been outsourced to Better Leisure.  Between September and October 2022 the mirrors in the baths' cubicles went missing and their theft was reported to Cumbria Police.

Closure 
In late 2022 Carlisle City Council determined that the baths were too expensive to run, citing running costs of around £26,500 a month.  The adjacent swimming pool complex had already been sold for development, which increased the costs of running the baths as a standalone attraction.  The baths closed on 12 November 2022.   The closure left only eleven operational Turkish baths in the UK, out of around 700 origianlly built, and only eight remaining open to the public.

A campaign group, the Friends of Carlisle Victorian and Turkish Baths, was formed to campaign for the reopening of the baths, which were the last Turkish baths in North West England.  The campaigners hope to turn the site into a health and wellbeing centre, with one of the pools converted into a hydrotherapy facility, and treatment rooms and an ice grotto installed.  The campaign hopes that local government changes, which will see the city come under Cumberland Council from April 2023, may lead to a reconsideration of the closure.  The chair of the campaign to save the baths, Julie Minns, was in February 2023, selected as the Labour Party candidate for the city's constituency in the next United Kingdom general election.

References 

Buildings and structures completed in 1909
Carlisle
Swimming venues in England
Grade II listed buildings in Cumbria